Regionalism may refer to:
 Regionalism (art), an American realist modern art movement that was popular during the 1930s
 Regionalism (international relations), the expression of a common sense of identity and purpose combined with the creation and implementation of institutions that express a particular identity and shape collective action within a geographical region
Regionalism (politics), a political ideology that focuses on the interests of a particular region or group of regions, whether traditional or formal
 Critical regionalism, in architecture, an approach that strives to counter placelessness and lack of identity in modern architecture by using the building's geographical context

Literature 
 American literary regionalism, refers to fiction or poetry that focuses on specific features – including characters, dialects, customs, history, and landscape – of a particular region
 British regional literature
 Criollismo, a literary movement

See also 
 Bioregionalism, regions defined by physical or environmental features

de:Regionalismus